Murchison-Toolamba Football Netball Club, nicknamed the Grasshoppers, is an Australian Rules Football and Netball club that plays its home games in the small north eastern Victoria town of Murchison. Its name also recognises the initial 1952 merger with nearby town of Toolamba.

It now competes in the Kyabram District Football League, where they field four teams in four grades of football (Seniors, Reserves, Under 18's & Under 12's), and 13 teams across 10 grades of Netball (KDNL; A-Grade, B-Grade, C-Grade, C Reserve, Under 17's, Under 15's, Under 13's and Under 11's. TNA Div 1 - Murchison Green, Murchison Gold, TNA Div 2 - Murchison, Toolamba Pink, Toolamba Black).

History
The Murchison FC was established in 1881 and began in the Upper Goulburn Football Association in 1897.

Toolamba, which has a population of about 900, had its own football club for the first half of the 20th century. But the club, which played in various district leagues, ended up merging with nearby Murchison. The merged entity was initially known as Murchison-Toolamba, and evidence of this, in the form of a team photo, still hangs in the Junction Hotel in Toolamba. However, the Toolamba name was dropped when the club joined the Kyabram District league in 1964. For the next five decades the club was simply known as the Murchison Grasshoppers. The name Murchison-Toolamba was reinstated following a member vote on 14 April 2016

The club's current colours are bottle green with a gold sash, with some white highlights being added in 2012 to reduce the clashing with opposition clubs Rushworth and Lancaster. The green with gold sash have been the colours of the club since 1910, before that the club wore black & white stripes with a green sash (1908–1909), Green & Gold Stripes with a Red Sash (1895–1907) and a Navy Jumper with Navy Knickerbockers, Red hose & Cap (1881–1894).

The current senior football coach is Nick Iorianni, A Grade netball coach is Jenni McCluskey and the President is Craig Thompson. The 2022 season saw Murchison-Toolamba FNC entered every possible KDL grade and all teams made finals. The Senior team went down in the decider by 10 points to Lancaster in torrential conditions.

Premierships 1st XVIII
Upper Goulburn Football Association
1897
Waranga Football Association
1904
Goulburn Valley Football League
1910
Waranga-North East Football League
1914
Euroa District Football League
1945
Kyabram & District Football League
1964, 1966, 1982, 2013

Premierships 2nd XVIII
Kyabram & District Football League
1967, 1972, 1982, 2001

Premierships 3rd XVIII
1970, 1980, 2010

Netball Premierships
A Grade 
Nil
B Grade 
Nil
C Grade 
2012, 2013, 2014
C Reserve 
Nil
17 & Under 
Nil
15 & Under 
Nil
13 & Under
Nil
11 & Under 
Nil

References

Sources
Grass Boots: It started as a hoot, but neglected Toolamba reclaims its history

External links

Official Kyabram and District Football League Website

1881 establishments in Australia
Australian rules football clubs established in 1881
Goulburn Valley Football League clubs